Mario Perazzolo (7 June 1911 – 3 August 2001) was an Italian footballer who played as a defender, as a midfielder or as a forward.

Club career 
During his career Perazzolo played for Padova and Fiorentina before moving to Genoa, where he spent most of his career; he later also played for Brescia and Siracusa. Like many great players Mario evolved technically. He started his career as an inside forward, a position he played for five years at Padova and three at Fiorentina. He later switched to centre-half and half-back where he played his best seasons for Genoa. For the national team, he also played in Meazza's position in an outing just after the team had won the 1936 Olympic title, subsequently switching to a midfield position as the World Cup approached. He was a starter in their final warm up before leaving for Paris, however Pozzo decided to go with Serantoni instead. He would win another six caps with the national team. At nearly forty years of age he played his last season at Siracusa in Serie B having won the FIFA World Cup and the Coppa Italia with Genoa.

International career 
Perazzolo was part of the 1938 FIFA World Cup-winning squad, Italy's second World Cup title. He earned 8 caps for the Italian national team in the 1930s between 1936 and 1939.

Death 
Perazzolo died on 3 August 2001 in Padua, aged 90.

Honours

Club 
Genoa
Coppa Italia: 1936–37

International 
Italy
FIFA World Cup: 1938

References 

1911 births
2001 deaths
Italian footballers
Italy international footballers
1938 FIFA World Cup players
FIFA World Cup-winning players
Genoa C.F.C. players
Sportspeople from Padua
Calcio Padova players
ACF Fiorentina players
Brescia Calcio players
A.S. Siracusa players
Serie A players
Italian football managers
Calcio Padova managers
A.S. Siracusa managers
Association football defenders
Association football midfielders
Association football forwards
Footballers from Veneto